24,601 is a number between 24,600 and 24,602.

24601 may also refer to:
24601 Valjean, a minor planet
"24601", Jean Valjean's inmate number
"24601", a ZIP code from Amonate, Virginia